The Global Campaign for Equal Nationality Rights is a campaign mobilizes international action to end gender discrimination in nationality laws through local and international advocacy, activism, research, capacity building and knowledge sharing.

The Global Campaign for Equal Nationality Rights works on amending nationality laws in the 50+ countries that prevent women from conferring their nationality to non-national spouses; and to reform nationality laws in the 25 countries which deny mothers their right to confer their nationality to their children, on equal basis with fathers.

Background and history 
Prior to the launch of the campaign in 2014, efforts to remove gender discrimination laws were only recently undertaken at a national level.

Founding Steering Committee and Coalition members 
The Campaign's Founding Steering Committee include: the Institute on Statelessness and Inclusion, Equal Rights Trust, UNHCR, Equality Now,   Women’s Refugee Commission and Women's Learning Partnership.

The Campaign is housed in New York by the Women's Refugee Commission.

The Global Campaign Coalition members include NGOs, UN agencies, activists, academics, civil society organizations and government allies.

Campaign Activities 
The Global Campaign for Equal Nationality Rights' core activities include local and international advocacy, capacity building and research and knowledge sharing. It collaborates with local and regional organizations to advocate for nationality law reform in target countries. The Campaign also mobilizes international actors, including UN actors, to take action to end gender discrimination in nationality laws.

References 

Gender equality
Human rights
Nationality law
Organizations based in New York City
2014 establishments in New York City
Feminist organizations in the United States